Jacques Opangault (13 December 1907 – 20 August 1978) was a Congolese politician. The founder of the Mouvement Socialiste Africain (MSA), he competed with Félix Tchicaya's Parti Progressiste Congolais (PPC) during two-party rule in Congo during the 1950s.

Life
He was born on 13 December 1907, in Ikagna.
In 1947, he was elected to the Territorial Assembly.
In 1957, he was prime minister of the provisional government.
In 1959, he was jailed after riots in Brazzaville.
From June 1961 to April 1962, he was vice president under Fulbert Youlou.
In 1963, he was arrested, after the fall of his government.
He retired from politics.

He died on 20 August 1978.

References

1907 births
1978 deaths
Prime Ministers of the Republic of the Congo
Vice presidents of the Republic of the Congo
Republic of the Congo socialists
People of French Equatorial Africa
People from Likouala Department
Library of Congress Africa Collection related